North East Fife may mean or refer to:

 North East Fife (UK Parliament constituency)
 North East Fife (Scottish Parliament constituency)
 North-East Fife (district)